Nguyễn Thị Như Hoa (born 21 February 1984) is a Vietnamese fencer. She competed in the women's épée event at the 2016 Summer Olympics.

References

External links
 

1984 births
Living people
Sportspeople from Hanoi
Vietnamese female épée fencers
Fencers at the 2016 Summer Olympics
Olympic fencers of Vietnam
Fencers at the 2006 Asian Games
Fencers at the 2010 Asian Games
Fencers at the 2018 Asian Games
Southeast Asian Games gold medalists for Vietnam
Southeast Asian Games silver medalists for Vietnam
Southeast Asian Games medalists in fencing
Competitors at the 2015 Southeast Asian Games
Competitors at the 2017 Southeast Asian Games
Asian Games competitors for Vietnam
21st-century Vietnamese women